David T. Lametti  (born August 10, 1962) is a Canadian politician who has been the minister of justice and attorney general of Canada since 2019. A member of the Liberal Party, Lametti sits as a member of Parliament (MP) and has represented LaSalle—Émard—Verdun in the House of Commons since 2015. 

Born in Port Colborne, Ontario, Lametti graduated from University of Toronto and studied law at McGill University, Yale University, and Exeter College, Oxford. Prior to entering politics, he was a professor of law at McGill University, a member of the Institute of Comparative Law, and a founding member of the Centre for Intellectual Property Policy.

Early life and career 

Lametti was born on August 10, 1962, in Port Colborne, Ontario, Canada, to Italian immigrants. Lametti earned his Bachelor of Arts degree in economics and political science from the University of Toronto in 1985, and his Bachelor of Laws and Bachelor of Civil Law degrees at McGill University in 1989. He then served as a clerk to Justice Peter Cory of the Supreme Court of Canada in 1989–90. In 1991, Lametti completed a Master of Laws degree from Yale Law School and in 1999, he completed a Doctor of Philosophy degree in law at Exeter College, Oxford, with a thesis, The Deon-Telos of Private Property: Ethical Aspects of the Theory and Practice of Private Property.

In 1995, after having been a visiting lecturer at the Faculty of Law, University of New Brunswick, Lametti accepted a lecturing position at the Faculty of Law, McGill University, where he taught and conducted research. He became an assistant professor in 1998, an associate professor in 2003, and was promoted to full professor with tenure in 2015. He lectured and wrote on subjects related to civil and common law property, intellectual property, property theory and ethics. His work led to the creation of the Centre for Intellectual Property Policy, which he co-founded in 2003 and for which he served as director from 2009 to 2011. He was Associate Dean (Academic) of the McGill Faculty of Law between 2008 and 2011, was a member of McGill University's Senate from 2012 to 2015, and was formerly a Governor of the Fondation du Barreau du Québec. During his parliamentary and ministerial service, he remains on leave from McGill.

Lametti is the author of academic publications on the subjects of property, intellectual property, and social norms.

Lametti served as co-captain of the Oxford University Ice Hockey Club alongside Mark Carney, and was a youth soccer coach in Montreal leagues.

Political career 

David Lametti became interested in politics as a teenager, when he worked as a volunteer for the Liberal Party in the 1979 Canadian federal election, and then subsequent provincial and federal elections for Liberal candidates. Among candidates for whom he volunteered are the former Canadian member of Parliament and Speaker of the House Gilbert Parent. Lametti co-founded the Erie Riding New Liberals, the youth wing of the Liberal Party of Canada in southern Niagara.

On June 16, 2014, Lametti launched his bid to become the Liberal Party candidate in the new riding of LaSalle-Émard-Verdun. Lametti won the contested nomination race on February 8, 2015, and won the riding's seat in Parliament in the 2015 Canadian federal election. On December 2, 2015, Lametti was named parliamentary secretary to then Minister of International Trade Chrystia Freeland. On January 26, 2017, Lametti was reshuffled to parliamentary secretary to the Minister of Innovation, Science and Economic Development, Navdeep Bains.

On January 14, 2019, Lametti was appointed Minister of Justice and Attorney General of Canada by Prime Minister Justin Trudeau, and on April 15 of that year, he was appointed a Queen's Counsel.

Electoral record

References

External links
 Official Website
 Bio & mandate from the Prime Minister
 

1962 births
Alumni of Exeter College, Oxford
Attorneys General of Canada
Canadian legal scholars
Canadian people of Italian descent
Canadian King's Counsel
Lawyers from Montreal
Liberal Party of Canada MPs
Living people
Academic staff of the McGill University Faculty of Law
Members of the 29th Canadian Ministry
Members of the House of Commons of Canada from Quebec
Members of the King's Privy Council for Canada
People from Port Colborne
Politicians from Montreal
Academic staff of the University of New Brunswick
University of Toronto alumni
Yale Law School alumni
21st-century Canadian politicians
McGill University Faculty of Law alumni